Tonuco Draw is an arroyo north of San Diego Mountain (Tonuco Mountain) in Doña Ana County, New Mexico.

References 

Landforms of Doña Ana County, New Mexico